Wysox Creek is a tributary of the Susquehanna River in Bradford County, Pennsylvania, in the United States. It is possible to canoe on part of the creek's length.

Course
Wysox Creek begins on a hill in Windham Township. It flows east for a short distance and leaves the hill. The creek then turns south and flows through a valley for several miles, flowing parallel to Pennsylvania Route 187. It eventually enters Orwell Township, where it receives the tributary Trout Brook and flows through North Orwell and Russelville. Several miles downstream, the creek picks up the tributary Trout Stream and turns southwest, still flowing parallel to Pennsylvania Route 187 in its valley. It eventually enters Rome Township, Bradford County, Pennsylvania, where it receives Parks Creek and passes through the community of Rome. Downstream of Rome, the creek turns south-southwest and picks up Ballard Creek. Some distance downstream, it enters Wysox Township, where it continues southwest and south-southwest. It receives several more tributaries before crossing U.S. Route 6 and reaching its confluence with the Susquehanna River.

Watershed and geography

There are some strainers on Wysox Creek. There are also gravel bar riffles on the creek. It flows through a flat and narrow valley and for much of its length flows through forested floodplains.

Recreation
The difficulty rating of the creek is 1+. Edward Gertler describes its scenery as "good" in his book Keystone Canoeing.

See also
List of rivers of Pennsylvania

References

Rivers of Pennsylvania
Tributaries of the Susquehanna River
Rivers of Bradford County, Pennsylvania